Jon Foster (born 1984) is an American actor.

Jon Foster may also refer to:

Jon Foster (artist), American freelance illustrator, penciler, and sculptor
Jon Foster (British actor), see List of EastEnders characters
Jonny Foster, fictional character

See also
John Foster (disambiguation)
Jonathan Foster (disambiguation)